Looking for Lewis and Clark: the Long Ryders Anthology is a two-CD compilation album by American band the Long Ryders, released in July 1998 on PolyGram's Chronicles label. It collects 40 tracks spanning the band's career from 1983 to 1987, including B-sides, demos and live recordings, many of which are previously unreleased. All tracks have been remastered for this release and the album's booklet includes sleevenotes by Rolling Stone'''s David Fricke. The long version of "Looking for Lewis and Clark" from the 10-inch single release makes its first appearance on CD here.

 Reception 

AllMusic's Matthew Greenwald called it "an excellent collection from one of the most honest and genuinely gifted bands of the period." He added, "They were a great band, and should be remembered as such. The Long Ryders' Anthology accomplishes just that." No Depression magazine wrote, "The uninitiated may find in this a new obsession, but old fans will recognize that the Long Ryders have aged pretty darn well for a band that looked and sounded worn to begin with." They felt, however, that the compilation wasn't without flaws, as some of the band's best tracks were omitted to make room for "a dozen or so rarities and (occasionally clunky) demos."

Track listing
Disc one

Disc two

Personnel
Credits are adapted from the album liner notes.

The Long Ryders
Sid Griffin – guitar, autoharp, harmonica, bugle, vocals
Steve McCarthy – guitar, steel guitar, banjo, mandolin, lap steel guitar, keyboards, vocals
Greg Sowders – drums, percussion, keyboards
Tom Stevens – bass, double bass, cello, acoustic guitar, vocals (except 10-5-60)
Des Brewer – bass, vocals (10-5-60'')
Additional musicians
Gene Clark – additional vocals on "Ivory Tower"
Dave Pearlman – steel guitar on "(Sweet) Mental Revenge"
Steve Wickham – violin on "If I Were a Bramble and You Were a Rose"
Christine Collister – vocals on "If I Were a Bramble and You Were a Rose"
Debbi Peterson – vocals on "I Want You Bad"
Vicki Peterson – vocals on "I Want You Bad"
David Hidalgo – accordion on "The Light Gets in the Way"
Technical
Bill Inglot – compilation producer, mastering, mixing 
Sid Griffin – compilation producer, mixing 
John Strother – mixing 
Dan Hersch – mastering
Ed Colver – cover photography
Glen Colver – booklet photos  
Greg Allen – booklet photos 
Henry Diltz – booklet photos 
Wherefore Art? – design
David Fricke – liner notes
Terri Tierney – project coordinator
Catherine Ladis – project assistance
Bill Levenson – executive producer
All previously unreleased tracks (except "I Can't Hide") mixed at Penguin Studios, Los Angeles, March 1997
All tracks mastered at DigiPrep Studios, Hollywood

References 

1998 compilation albums
The Long Ryders albums